Longtown is a market town in Cumbria, England, just south of the Scottish Border. It has a sheep market which was at the centre of the 2001 United Kingdom foot-and-mouth crisis. Just south-west of Longtown is Arthuret Church, dedicated to Saint Michael and All Angels.

Location
It is in the parish of Arthuret and on the River Esk.

History
Historically in Cumberland, nearby was the Battle of Arfderydd in 573. The Battle of Solway Moss was fought nearby in 1542.

2001 UK Foot and mouth crisis

Longtown is the location of the largest sheep markets in England. The first animal to be found infected with foot-and-mouth disease in the 2001 crisis had been purchased at Longtown Market. While at the market it spread the infection to other animals. The size of the Longtown Sheep Market meant that the disease had spread right across the country in a very short time. Longtown became the centre for control of the disease in south western Scotland and North West England.

Governance
Longtown is in the parliamentary constituency of Penrith and the Border. Neil Hudson was elected its Conservative Member of Parliament at the 2019 General Election, replacing Rory Stewart.

Before Brexit for  the European Parliament residents in Longtown voted to elect MEPs for the North West England constituency.

For Local Government purposes it is in the Longtown + The Border Ward of Carlisle City Council and the Longtown Division of Cumbria County Council.

Longtown has its own parish council; Arthuret Parish Council.

Education
Longtown has one primary school with around 190 pupils. Most secondary school pupils travel to William Howard School, Brampton, or Carlisle. Though up until 2008 Longtown had its own secondary school, Lochinvar School.

Environment

In April 2014 Carlisle City Council rejected a planning application for a two million gallon slurry lagoon at Scaurbank Wood, to the north east of Longtown. The planned slurry lagoon was said to be the most objected to plan in the City Council's history, with more than 1,400 letters or e-mails of objection.

Industry

Coal mining
Lochinvar coalfield was discovered in the 1950s by the National Coal Board and was subject to drilling but never mined. From 2014 an Australian firm was exploring the coalfield for coking coal to produce steel.  The company was exploring as far north as Evertown near Canonbie, and as far south as Longtown.

DMC Longtown
During the 1930s, there was a recognition of a need to provide secure storage for munitions across the United Kingdom. The proposal was to create three Central Ammunition Depots (CAD): one in the south (Monkton Farleigh, Wiltshire); one in the Midlands (Nesscliffe, Shropshire); and one in the north.

While the other two sites were sat above easily hewn limestone, Longtown is located above granite, which meant that it took longer to create and only came into operations late in the Second World War. The site was chosen as it used to be part of HM Factory, Gretna, that stretched to Eastriggs over the border in Scotland, one of the biggest makers of explosives during the First World War. The township of Gretna was established to house the workers of this establishment.

Today, DMC (Defence Munitions Centre) Longtown is the only one of the three CADs to remain in operation and is among the largest defence munitions sites in Western Europe. Currently, Longtown and Eastriggs are two separate sites under joint management. In November 2013 the MoD announced that the operational capacity of MoD Longtown would be reduced and a small area of the site would be given over to commercial use.

See also

Listed buildings in Arthuret

References

External links

  Cumbria County History Trust: Arthuret (nb: provisional research only - see Talk page)

Towns in Cumbria
City of Carlisle